Humphery is a rural locality in the North Burnett Region, Queensland, Australia.

Geography
The Burnett River forms the south-western boundary and part of the southern before flowing through and forming part of the eastern boundary. Aranbanga Creek also forms part of the southern boundary before joining the Burnett River.

Boomerang is a neighbourhood in the locality.

The Mungar-to-Monto railway line traverses the locality roughly following the northern side of the Burnett River, entering from the east (Dirnbir) and exiting to the north-west (Philpott). There were two railway stations serving the locality but both are now abandoned:

 Humphery railway station
 Boomerang railway station

History 
In 1853 the run was held in 1853 by Edmund L. Smee.

Heritage listings 
Humphery has a number of heritage-listed sites, including:
 Mungar-to-Monto railway line: Humphery Railway Bridge

References

External links 

North Burnett Region
Localities in Queensland